Parque del Tricentenario is a passive urban park in the city of Ponce, Puerto Rico. The park was built to commemorate the 300th anniversary of the founding of the city. It was inaugurated during the mayoral administration of mayor Rafael Cordero Santiago.

Location
The park is a passive urban family park. It is located in Barrio Tercero at the entrance to the Ponce Historic Zone on Miguel Pou Boulevard, at the southern terminus of PR-1.

Features
The park is a three-plaza park. All three plazas have gardens and marble benches. Setting the stage for the park is El Puente de los Leones (The Bridge of the Lions). It spans Rio Portugues and is the gateway to, not just Parque del Tricentenario, but to the Ponce historical district as well. It features two brass lions guarding the entrance: the older lion represents wisdom and experience, while the younger one stands for the glorious future.

The Illustrious Ponce Citizens Plaza
Its centerpiece is a plaza containing a fountain dedicated to Ponce's most illustrious citizens. This plaza is known as Parque de los Ponceños Ilustres (the Illustrious Ponce Citizens Plaza). At either side of this plaza, and tucked in somewhat but facing side streets that lead to and return from the center of the city, are two separate areas dedicated to two of the most honored citizens of Ponce. The one on the right is dedicated to governor Rafael Hernandez Colon; the one on the left is dedicated to governor Luis A. Ferre.  A large wall near Hernandez Colon's right plazalette has the encryption, "Ponce es del que nos visita. Ponce es nuestro" (Ponce belongs to those who visit us. Ponce is ours).  

The middle area is the largest area of this plaza. It contains a very large fountain and behind the fountain are 24 "kiosks" with fountainettes. Sixteen of these fountainette kiosks are dedicated to illustrious Ponce citizens in 16 different areas of endeavor. Moving from left to right, these twelve areas are: History, Politics, Journalism, Writing, Architecture, Citizenship, Medicine, Music, Craftsmanship, Education, Sports, Plastic Arts, Law, Business, Ponceñistas, and Theatrical Arts. Each fountainette kiosk then has one or more plaques with the names or those being honored engraved on them. Every few years the municipal government announces that new names are to be added to the list and petitions its citizens for suggestions.

The Francisco Porrata Doria Plaza

The second major plaza, called the Plaza de la Arquitectura Francisco Porrata Doria (Francisco Porrata Doria Architecture Plaza), features a rotunda and honors the city's architecture. On the rotunda's outer crown is the following encryption: "Ponce es Tradicion, Cultura, Espiritu, Civismo, Ilusion. Ponce es Virtud." ("Ponce is Tradition, Culture, Spirit, Civism, Ilusion. Ponce is Virtue.") The same rotunda has another encryption on its floor that reads: "Estabilidad, Durabilidad, Conveniencia, Belleza, Firmeza." ("Estability, Durability, Convenience, Beauty, Resolution.") To the right of this plaza is the bust of governor Roberto Sanchez Vilella who, though not born in Ponce, did lived there during his formative school years, and is considered an adopted son of the city.

The Latin American Statesmen Plaza
The third major plaza honors Latin American statesmen and it is called Plaza de los Próceres Latinoamericanos (Latin-American Statesmen Plaza). This third plaza is dedicated to Simón Bolívar, Juan Pablo Duarte, José Martí, and Luis Muñoz Marín, and there are statues of these prominent people there.

History
The park was inaugurated in 1992 under the administration of mayor Rafael Cordero Santiago.

Symbolisms
The entrance of the park, via Puente de Los Leones, is guarded by two massive pillars each topped by a lion - one the symbol of knowledge, the other the symbol of power.

References

External links

 Photo of Lions Bridge circa 1923 when it used to be called Machuelo Bridge. The bridge is located in the southern end of Barrio Machuelo Abajo (also called "Machuelo Urbano" after it became urbanized) immediately across from Parque del Tricentenario. Accessed 5 January 2011.

Buildings and structures in Ponce, Puerto Rico
Tourist attractions in Ponce, Puerto Rico
Urban public parks
Parks in Ponce, Puerto Rico
Protected areas established in 1992
1992 in Puerto Rico
1992 establishments in Puerto Rico
Tricentennial anniversaries